Epibulus is a genus of wrasses native to the Indian Ocean and the western Pacific Ocean.

Species
The currently recognized species in this genus are:
 Epibulus brevis Carlson, J. E. Randall & M. N. Dawson, 2008 (latent sling-jaw wrasse)
 Epibulus insidiator (Pallas, 1770) (sling-jaw wrasse)

References

 
Labridae
Marine fish genera
Taxa named by Georges Cuvier